Drei Kapuziner is a mountain in Liechtenstein in the Rätikon range of the Eastern Alps, close to the towns of Malbun and Steg, with a height of .

References

Mountains of Liechtenstein
Mountains of the Alps